Aalto-Hochhaus is a 22-floor high-rise apartment building in Bremen, Germany, designed by Alvar Aalto. It is approximately 60 meters tall and was completed in 1962. Since 1998, it is protected by the monument protection act.

See also 
Alvar Aalto buildings

References

External links 
 http://skyscraperpage.com/diagrams/?buildingID=19447
 http://en.structurae.de/structures/data/index.cfm?ID=s0029403

Buildings and structures in Bremen (city)
Alvar Aalto buildings
Residential buildings completed in 1962
Modernist architecture in Germany
Apartment buildings in Germany